Dick Anne Benschop (born 5 November 1957) is a former Dutch politician of the Labour Party (PvdA) and businessman. He was the CEO and chairman of the Schiphol Group since 1 May 2018 until 1 November 2022 and chairman of the  since 1 June 2017.

Career
Benschop worked as a political consultant for the Labour Party from 1986 until 1996. After the election of 1998 Benschop was appointed as State Secretary for Foreign Affairs in the Cabinet Kok II, serving from 3 August 1998 until 22 July 2002. 

Benschop served as the Labour Party campaign manager for the election of 2002. The Labour Party suffered a big defeat in the election losing 23 seats in the House of Representatives, Leader of the Labour Party and Lijsttrekker (top candidate) Ad Melkert accepted responsibility for the defeat and sequentially left national politics. Benschop who was elected as a Member of the House of Representatives after the election, also took responsibility for the defeat and served in the House of Representatives from 23 May 2002 until his resignation on 1 September 2002.

He served as CEO of the Schiphol airport group until Sept 2022, when he resigned following months of chaos.

Other activities
 Trilateral Commission, Member of the European Group

Decorations

References

External links
 
  Drs. D.A. (Dick) Benschop Parlement & Politiek

 

 

 

 

1957 births
Living people
Directors of Shell plc
Dutch academic administrators
Dutch campaign managers
Dutch chief executives in the airline industry
Dutch chief executives in the oil industry
Dutch corporate directors
20th-century Dutch historians
Dutch nonprofit directors
Dutch nonprofit executives
Dutch political consultants
Dutch speechwriters
Knights of the Order of Orange-Nassau
Labour Party (Netherlands) politicians
Members of the House of Representatives (Netherlands)
People from Driebergen-Rijsenburg
State Secretaries for Foreign Affairs of the Netherlands
Vrije Universiteit Amsterdam alumni
Academic staff of Vrije Universiteit Amsterdam
20th-century Dutch educators
20th-century Dutch politicians
21st-century Dutch businesspeople
21st-century Dutch politicians